Noemi is the first EP by Italian singer Noemi. It contains the single "Briciole", two covers and three new songs. The EP was certified by Sony BMG gold disc with more than 50,000 copies sold.

Track listing

Charts

Album

Singles

Noemi tour

Band
Emanuele (Lele) Fontana (keyboard)
Donald Renda (drum)
Giacomo Castellano (guitar)
Ronny Aglietti (bass)

Tour

Certification

References

2009 debut EPs
Noemi (singer) EPs
Sony Music Italy EPs